Events from the year 1823 in the United States.

Incumbents

Federal Government 
 President: James Monroe (DR-Virginia)
 Vice President: Daniel D. Tompkins (DR-New York)
 Chief Justice: John Marshall (Virginia)
 Speaker of the House of Representatives: Philip P. Barbour (DR-Virginia) (until March 4), Henry Clay (DR-Kentucky) (starting December 1)
 Congress: 17th (until March 4), 18th (starting March 4)

Events
 February 3 – Jackson Male Academy, precursor of Union University, opens in Tennessee.
 August 4 – Felipe Enrique Neri, Baron de Bastrop, the Mexican government administrator in charge of Anglo-American immigration into Mexico's state of Coahuila y Tejas, allows Stephen F. Austin to put together an 11-man police force, that will later be expanded to become the Texas Ranger Division.
 August 9 – The Arikara War breaks out between the Arikara nation and the United States, the first American military conflict with the Plains Indians.
 August 23 – Hugh Glass is attacked and mauled by a sow grizzly bear and left for dead in the Missouri Territory. He crawls 200 miles before reaching help, events depicted in The Revenant (2015 film).
 September 22 – Joseph Smith first goes to the place near Manchester, New York, where the golden plates are stored, having been directed there by God through an angel (according to what he writes in 1838).
 November 15 – Lone Horn succeeds (probably) his father, and becomes chief of the Minneconjou Sioux; he will be chief until his death on October 16, 1875.
 December 2 – Monroe Doctrine: U.S. President James Monroe delivers a speech to the U.S. Congress, announcing a new policy of forbidding European interference in the Americas and establishing American neutrality in future European conflicts.
 December 23 – A Visit From St. Nicholas, attributed to Clement Clarke Moore, is first published.

Undated
 United States jurisprudence first affirms the enduring rights of indigenous landholders (tribal sovereignty).
 Orford Parish of East Hartford, Connecticut separates and is incorporated as the Town of Manchester by a special act of the Connecticut General Assembly.
 Middlebury College, Vermont, becomes the first U.S. institution of higher education to grant a bachelor's degree to an African American, graduating Alexander Twilight.
 John Neal publishes Seventy-Six, the first American work of fiction to include the phrase "son-of-a-bitch."

Ongoing
 Era of Good Feelings (1817–1825)
 A. B. plot (1823–1824)

Births
 January 23 – Dan Rice, clown (died 1900)
 January 28 – Philip Spencer, founder of Chi Psi fraternity and midshipman aboard  (died 1842)
 February 3 – Spencer Fullerton Baird, zoologist (died 1887)
 February 5 – Rachel Crane Mather, educator (died 1903)
 March 23 – Schuyler Colfax, 17th Vice President of the United States from 1869 to 1873 (died 1885)
 April 1 – Simon Bolivar Buckner, soldier, politician and Confederate soldier (died 1914)
 April 3 – William M. Tweed, politician (died 1878)
 May 10 – John Sherman, 32nd United States Secretary of the Treasury, 35th United States Secretary of State (died 1900)
 May 15 – Thomas Lake Harris, poet (died 1906)
 May 22 – Solomon Bundy, politician (died 1889)
 May 26 – William Pryor Letchworth, businessman and philanthropist (died 1910)
 July 1 – Charles B. Farwell, U.S. Senator from Illinois from 1887 to 1891 (died 1903)
 July 9 (date uncertain) – Phineas Gage, improbable head injury survivor (died 1860)
 July 18 – Leonard Fulton Ross, Civil War general (died 1901)
 July 24 – Arthur I. Boreman, U.S. Senator from West Virginia from 1869 to 1875 (died 1896)
 August 3 – Thomas Francis Meagher, Civil War general (died 1867)
 August 4 – Oliver P. Morton, U.S. Senator from Indiana from 1867 to 1877 (died 1877)
 August 5 – Eliza Tibbets, mother of the California orange industry (died 1898)
 August 15 – Orris S. Ferry, Civil War general and U.S. Senator from Connecticut from 1867 to 1875 (died 1875)
 September 14 – Benjamin Harvey Hill, U.S. Senator from Georgia from 1877 to 1882 (died 1882)
 September 15 – Hugh Buchanan, politician from Georgia (died 1890)
 September 23
 James Black, temperance leader (died 1893)
 Sara Jane Lippincott, author, poet, correspondent, lecturer and newspaper founder (died 1904)
 September 27
 Frederick H. Billings, lawyer and financier (died 1890)
 Augusta Harvey Worthen, author and educator (died 1910)
 October 6 – George Henry Boker, poet, playwright and diplomat (died 1890)
 November 16 – Henry G. Davis, politician (died 1916)
 November 18 – Charles H. Bell, U.S. Senator from New Hampshire in 1879 (died 1893)
 November 23 – Eliza Hendricks, Second Lady of the United States (died 1903)
 November 25 – Henry Wirz, Confederate military officer, prisoner-of-war camp commander (died 1865)
 December 22 – Thomas Wentworth Higginson, Unitarian minister and abolitionist (died 1911)
 December 23 – Thomas W. Evans, dentist (died 1897 in France)
 December 28 – Thomas A. Scott, businessman and politician, President of the Pennsylvania Railroad from 1874 to 1880 (died 1882)

Deaths
 January 21 – Gideon Olin, politician (born 1743)
 April 18 – George Cabot, merchant, seaman and U.S. Senator from Massachusetts from 1791 to 1796 (born 1752)
 April 23 – John Williams Walker, U.S. Senator from Alabama from 1819 to 1822 (born 1783)
 September 28 – Charlotte Melmoth, tragic actress (born 1749 in Great Britain)
 October 8 – Martin D. Hardin, U.S. Senator from Kentucky from 1816 to 1817 (born 1780)

See also
Timeline of United States history (1820–1859)

References

External links
 

 
1820s in the United States
United States
United States
Years of the 19th century in the United States